Tyler Lassiter (born April 7, 1989 in Wake Forest, North Carolina) is an American soccer player.

Career

College and amateur
Lassiter attended Wake Forest-Rolesville High School in Wake Forest, North Carolina, and played four years of college soccer at North Carolina State. He initially began his career as a left back but was converted to center back during his second year at NC State. In his four years at North Carolina State Lassiter appeared in 73 matches and scored 12 goals.

Lassiter played with Cary Clarets in the USL Premier Development League during the 2008 and 2009 collegiate off-season. On July 10, 2008 Lassiter scored for Cary in a 2-1 victory over Burnley during Burnley's pre-season tour of the United States.

Professional
Lassiter was selected 30th overall in the 2011 MLS SuperDraft by New York Red Bulls. On June 28, 2011 Lassiter made his first team debut for Red Bulls in a 2-1 victory over FC New York in the US Open Cup.

On August 30, 2011, New York announced that Lassiter had been loaned to Carolina RailHawks of the North American Soccer League for the remainder of the RailHawks’ season.

Lassiter was waived by New York on November 23, 2011. He signed with Wilmington Hammerheads of the USL Professional Division on February 16, 2012.

References

External links

NC State Profile

1989 births
Living people
American soccer players
NC State Wolfpack men's soccer players
Cary Clarets players
New York Red Bulls players
North Carolina FC players
Wilmington Hammerheads FC players
USL League Two players
North American Soccer League players
USL Championship players
New York Red Bulls draft picks
People from Wake Forest, North Carolina
Association football defenders